Kennedy is an extinct town in Pemiscot County, in the U.S. state of Missouri. The GNIS classifies it as a populated place.

A post office called Kennedy was established in 1890, and remained in operation until 1915. The community's name honors the local Kennedy family.

References

Ghost towns in Missouri
Former populated places in Pemiscot County, Missouri